Jakes Creek is a stream in northeastern Dallas County in the U.S. state of Missouri. It is a tributary of the Niangua River.

A variant name is Jaques Creek, but the identity of the namesake is unknown.

See also
List of rivers of Missouri

References

Rivers of Dallas County, Missouri
Rivers of Missouri